Mary Ann Mansigh Karlsen (born 1932) is a computer programmer who was active in the 1950s in the use of scientific computers.

Biography
Mansigh attended the University of Minnesota on a scholarship from 1950 to 1954, where she studied physics, chemistry and mathematics. In 1955, she took a position at the Lawrence Livermore National Laboratory as a software engineer, where she would remain until she retired in 1994, working on over 13 generations of supercomputers from the UNIVAC (1955) to the Cray I (1994).

At the Lawrence Livermore National Laboratory, she worked with Berni Alder and Tom Wainwright in the implementation of molecular dynamics in the mid twentieth century, ultimately working exclusively with Alder for over twenty-five years.  She is regarded as a pioneer in programming and computing, particularly molecular dynamics computing, whom Dutch computational physicist Daan Frenkel noted as being one of the very few notable female computer programmers, with Arianna W. Rosenbluth, that were active in the 1950s and 1960s.

Initially forgotten, except in annotations and oral transcripts, she has received increased attention in recent times, with events and talks on her legacy. In 2019, she had a lecture series at the Centre Européen de Calcul Atomique et Moléculaire (CECAM) named in her honour. Modern academics have noted her unfair absence as an author in published academic papers describing the results of computer programmes designed with her pioneering molecular dynamics computing code.

See also
Mary Tsingou

References

External links 
 Computer Pioneer Mary Ann Mansigh Karlsen (Livermore Library and the American Association of University Women, March 2017)
  Mary Ann Mansigh series: Almost famous, the woman behind the codes (Centre Européen de Calcul Atomique et Moléculaire (CECAM), May 2020)
 Picture of Alder, Mansigh & Wainwright, in the Niels Bohr subssection of the AIP Emilio Segre Visual Archives. (University of Chicago)
Flowchart template (Object has "Mary Ann Mansigh" handwritten in red on lower edge) (Computer History Museum, Catalogue Number: 102678315)

1932 births
Place of birth missing (living people)
Living people
Scientific computing researchers
Computer programmers
Nationality missing
American women computer scientists
American computer scientists
University of Minnesota College of Science and Engineering alumni
Lawrence Livermore National Laboratory staff
20th-century American women scientists